The Australian Chamber Orchestra (ACO) was founded by cellist John Painter in 1975. Richard Tognetti was appointed Lead Violin in 1989 and subsequently appointed Artistic Director.

As well as frequent Australian tours, the Sydney-based Australian Chamber Orchestra often tours Asia, Europe and the US, including regular performances at London's Wigmore Hall, New York's Carnegie Hall and Lincoln Center, Vienna's Musikverein and Washington's Kennedy Center.

In 2014 an album of the orchestra, featuring the American soprano Dawn Upshaw as soloist, won three Grammy Awards. The orchestra appears in the films Musical Renegades and Musica Surfica and the television series Classical Destinations series two.

In 2005, ACO Collective, a second ensemble combining emerging artists and Australian Chamber Orchestra musicians was formed as a training and regional touring orchestra.

The ACO musicians perform on a collection of 11 Golden Age string instruments, including three Stradivarius violins.Richard Tognetti performs on a 1743 Guarneri del Gesù violin, on loan from an anonymous benefactor. Principal Violin Satu Vanska performs on the 1726 Belgiorno Stradivarius on loan from Guido and Michelle Belgiorno-Nettis, Principal Cello Timo-Veikko Valve performs on a 1616 Brothers Amati Cello on loan from the ACO Instrument Fund and Principal Violin Helena Rathbone plays a 1732 Stradivarius violin on loan from an anonymous benefactor.

In 2021, the Orchestra was described as Extremely Online.

Awards and nominations

AIR Awards
The Australian Independent Record Awards (commonly known informally as AIR Awards) is an annual awards night to recognise, promote and celebrate the success of Australia's Independent Music sector.

! 
|-
| 2021
| Brahms: Symphonies 3 & 4 Ensemble Offspring - Songbirds (with Richard Tognetti)
| Best Independent Classical Album or EP
| 
| 
|-
| 2022
| River (with Richard Tognetti)
| Best Independent Classical Album or EP
|  
|

ARIA Music Awards
The ARIA Music Awards is an annual awards ceremony that recognises excellence, innovation, and achievement across all genres of Australian music. They commenced in 1987. 

! 
|-
| 1987
| Mozart in Delphi
|rowspan="8"|  Best Classical Album
| 
|rowspan="8"|  
|-
| 1993
| Janáček: Kreutzer Sonata for Strings, Barber: Adagio for Strings, Walton: Sonata for Strings (with  Richard Tognetti)
| 
|-
|rowspan="2"| 1994
| Mendelssohn: Octet in E Flat for Strings Op. 20 Sinfonia No. 9 in C. Swiss (with Richard Tognetti)
| 
|-
| Symphony Serenades and Suites (with Richard Tognetti)
| 
|-
|rowspan="2"| 1996
| Peter Sculthorpe: Music for Strings
| 
|-
| Spirit
| 
|-
| 1997
| Il Tramonto - The Sunset
| 
|-
| 2000
| Beethoven Violin Concerto & Mozart Symphony No. 40 (with Richard Tognetti)
| 
|-
| 2004
| Musical Renegades
| Best Original Soundtrack, Cast or Show Album
| 
| 
|-
| 2007
| Bach Violin Concertos (with Richard Tognetti)
|rowspan="5"|  Best Classical Album
| 
|rowspan="5"|  
|-
| 2009
| Classical Destinations II
| 
|-
| 2010
| Mozart Violin Concertos (with Richard Tognetti & Christopher Moore)
| 
|-
| 2011
| Mozart Violin Concertos Vol 2 (with Richard Tognetti)
| 
|-
| 2016
| Mozart's Last Symphonies (with Richard Tognetti)
| 
|-
| 2017
| Mountain (with Richard Tognetti)
| Best Original Soundtrack, Cast or Show Album
| 
| 
|-
| 2019
| Heroines (with Richard Tognetti)
|rowspan="1"|  Best Classical Album
| 
|  
|-
| 2022
| River (with Richard Tognetti)
| Best Original Soundtrack or Musical Theatre Cast Album
| 
| 
|-

References

External links
 ACO website

ARIA Award winners
Australian orchestras
Chamber orchestras
Musical groups established in 1975
Arts organizations established in 1975